Mike Salmon may refer to:
 Mike Salmon (footballer)
 Mike Salmon (American football)
 Mike Salmon (racing driver)